The 2005 Durham mayoral election was held on November 8, 2005 to elect the mayor of Durham, North Carolina. It saw the reelection of incumbent mayor Bill Bell.

Results

Primary 
The date of the primary was October 11, 2005.

Candidate Vincent Brown formally withdrew before the election, thus no votes were counted for him.

General election

References 

Durham
Mayoral elections in Durham, North Carolina
Durham